Charles 'Charlie' Bouguenon (born 30 June 1983), is a South African actor. He is best known for his roles in the popular international television serials and films Bloodshot, Transformers: The Last Knight and Homeland.

Personal life
He was born on 30 June 1983 in South Africa. His father and grandfather were classical musicians.

Career
Charles began performing at an early age where he started with violin and music theory at the age of four. However, he later continued to move towards acting. During school period, he was very active in dramatic societies with performances in stage. He later studied drama at the University of Pretoria, and completed a teacher's diploma in Latin American and Ballroom dance, as well as a certificate in Stage Combat.

In 2008, he appeared in the television serial Scandal! and also starred in several popular serials such as Jozi Streets, and Egoli. However, he is best known for his recurring role as Coco's boyfriend 'Brad' in the 2011 television sitcom It's for Life. In 2011, he played the role of 'Jimmy Meyer' in the televisioin soap opera 7de Laan as well as in the soapie Binneland.

He also performed in theatre plays such as Fame: the musical, Janice Honeyman's Cinderella Pantomime, Ladies Night, Antony & Cleopatra, Now That's Tap, Thoroughly Modern Millie, Buddy: the Buddy Holly Story, The King & I, Houtkruis: Die Musical and The Rocky Horror Picture Show.

Filmography

References

External links
 

Living people
People from the Eastern Cape
South African male television actors
1983 births
South African musicians